Kiriau Turepu is a Cook Islands politician and former Cabinet Minister.  He is a member of the Cook Islands Party.

Turepu was educated at Northland College in New Zealand. He represented the Cook Islands in tennis at the 1971 South Pacific Games in Papeete, Tahiti.

Turepu was first elected to Parliament in the 2006 Matavera by-election.  As a result, the government lost its majority and dissolved Parliament to avoid a confidence vote.  He was unsuccessful in the ensuing 2006 election, but was re-elected at the 2010 election.

Cabinet Minister
In May 2011 Turepu was made associate minister of agriculture. In July 2013 he was appointed to Cabinet proper as Minister of Agriculture. In November 2013 he was also given responsibility for the Business and Environment portfolios. He was re-elected at the 2014 election, In 2017 he established the Marae Moana marine sanctuary, which at the time was the largest multiple-use marine protected area in the world.

He lost his seat in the 2018 election to Vaitoti Tupa.

References

Living people
Members of the Parliament of the Cook Islands
Cook Islands Party politicians
Government ministers of the Cook Islands
Year of birth missing (living people)